Road Cruisin' is the seventh studio album by Japanese Pop band Deen. It was released on 18 August 2004 under BMG Funhouse.

The album consists of two previously released singles, Rail no nai Sora e and Taiyou to Hanabira and Strong Soul. This is their first album which was released in two formats: regular CD edition and limited CD+DVD edition. In DVD disc are included music videoclips of the singles "Rail no nai Sora e" and "Strong Soul".

The album reached #13 in its first week and charted for 3 weeks, selling 19,000 copies.

Track listing

In media
Ocean - ending theme for Nihon TV program NNN Kyou no Dekikoto
Strong Soul - theme song for 35th anniversary of Tokyo Verdy 1969

References

Sony Music albums
Japanese-language albums
2004 albums
Deen (band) albums